Sir Thomas Jervoise (11 June 1587 – 20 October 1654) was an English politician who sat in the House of Commons variously between 1621 and 1653. He was a staunch supporter of the Parliamentary side  during the English Civil War.

Jervoise was a member of the Jervoise family of Britford, Wiltshire. He received his knighthood from James I at Sarum on 20 August 1607.

In 1621 Jervoise was elected Member of Parliament for Whitchurch and held the seat until 1625. He was re-elected in 1628 and sat until 1629, when King Charles decided to rule without parliament. Jervoise was re-elected MP for Whitchurch in April 1640 for the Short Parliament, and again in November 1640 for the Long Parliament. He survived Pride's Purge and was a member of the Rump Parliament until 1653. He was a puritan and a strong supporter of the parliamentary cause.

In July 1601, aged 14, Jervoise married Lucy Powlet, daughter of Sir Richard Powlet of Herriard and Freefolk, Hampshire, and thereby acquired the Herriard estate and influence in Hampshire, to add to his family's substantial estates in Wiltshire, Worcestershire and Shropshire. Lucy died in 1641, and within two years Jervoise married Frances, daughter of Thomas Jay of Foscott, Buckinghamshire. He had four sons (one predeceased) and two daughters by his first wife, and two sons by his second.

His son Richard Jervoise was MP with him at Whitchurch, and his eldest son Thomas Jervoise was later MP for Hampshire.

Jervoise died at the age of 67.

References

1587 births
1654 deaths
English MPs 1621–1622
English MPs 1624–1625
English MPs 1625
English MPs 1626
English MPs 1628–1629
English MPs 1640 (April)
English MPs 1640–1648
English MPs 1648–1653
17th-century English Puritans